Cheryl Summers Landis (born October 11, 1954) is a Democratic politician from Maryland. She was a member of the Maryland House of Delegates, representing district 23B, based in Prince George's County.

Career
Landis worked for nearly three decades as a member of the Prince George's County Board of Education from 1989 to 2016, serving as an executive administrative officer and strategic business partnerships specialist. She was also the education coordinator to former Prince George's County executive Rushern Baker.

In November 2016, Landis was defeated in the general election by Raheela Ahmed.

Before getting appointed to the Maryland House of Delegates, Landis served as the chair of the Prince George's County Democratic Central Committee from 2014 to 2021. She also served as a Democratic National Committeewoman for Maryland and on the Maryland Democratic Party's executive, credentials and rules committees.

In the legislature
Long has been a member of the Maryland House of Delegates since October 8, 2021. She initially said that she would give "strong consideration" to seeking a four-year term in 2022, but ultimately decided not to run for re-election.

Committee assignments
 Health and Government Operations Committee, 2021–present

Other memberships
 Legislative Black Caucus of Maryland, 2021–present
 Women Legislators of Maryland, 2021–present

References and notes

Democratic Party members of the Maryland House of Delegates
1954 births
Living people
21st-century American politicians